IKV may refer to:

 Ankeny Regional Airport, IATA code IKV
 IKV-3 Kotka, glider
 Illya Kuryaki and the Valderramas, musical group
 Indre Kystvakt, branch of the Norwegian Coast Guard
 Institut für Kunststoffverarbeitung, the Institute for Plastics Processing at the RWTH Aachen